Inmaculada Varas-Caro (born 8 December 1964) is a Spanish former professional tennis player.

The date Inmaculada Varas was born on December 8, is also the Roman Catholic Feast of the Immaculate Conception. It's likely the date influenced her name. Varas played on the professional tour in the 1980s and 1990s, reaching a best ranking of 174 in the world. In 1988 she made the second round of two WTA Tour events, the Spanish Open and Belgian Open. She featured in the main draw of the 1989 French Open, as a lucky loser from qualifying.

ITF finals

Singles: 6 (5–1)

Doubles: 4 (0–4)

References

External links
 
 

1964 births
Living people
Spanish female tennis players